is a Japanese football player. He plays for Suzuka Point Getters.

Career
Shota Hasunuma joined J3 League club Fukushima United FC in 2016.

Club statistics
Updated to 20 February 2020.

References

External links

Profile at Fukushima United FC

1993 births
Living people
Sendai University alumni
Association football people from Ibaraki Prefecture
Japanese footballers
J3 League players
Japan Football League players
Fukushima United FC players
Veertien Mie players
Suzuka Point Getters players
Association football midfielders